This is a list of sittings of the French Parliament.

List 

 1st legislature of the French Fifth Republic
2nd legislature of the French Fifth Republic
3rd legislature of the French Fifth Republic
4th legislature of the French Fifth Republic
5th legislature of the French Fifth Republic
6th legislature of the French Fifth Republic
7th legislature of the French Fifth Republic
8th legislature of the French Fifth Republic
9th legislature of the French Fifth Republic
10th legislature of the French Fifth Republic
11th legislature of the French Fifth Republic
12th legislature of the French Fifth Republic
13th legislature of the French Fifth Republic
14th legislature of the French Fifth Republic
15th legislature of the French Fifth Republic 
16th legislature of the French Fifth Republic (current)

See also 

 List of French MPs
List of legislatures by country

Politics of France
National Assembly (France)
Parliamentary history of France